People I Know is a 2002 crime drama film directed by Daniel Algrant. The film stars Al Pacino, Kim Basinger, Ryan O'Neal, and Téa Leoni. 

People I Know premiered in Italy on October 11, 2002, and was released in the United States on April 25, 2003, by Miramax. The film received mixed reviews.

Plot
Eli Wurman (Al Pacino) is an aging, burnt-out Jewish publicist whose best days are well behind him and wishes to retire from his line of work, but all he knows is how to hustle, cajole, threaten, and persuade. The hazy mania of his everyday life is fuelled by a steady stream of prescription drugs and alcohol. One night, Eli's last remaining "big client" Cary Launer (Ryan O'Neal) – an actor considering a campaign for political office – entreats Eli to take care of his latest publicity mess, a dangerous liaison with Jilli Hopper (Téa Leoni), a hard-shelled, quick-tongued television actress with a soft centre and a taste for illegal drugs.

The actress takes Eli to a drug-and-sex den, a playground for the rich and famous, where she claims to be looking for a toy. Jilli is escorted off the premises by security. As she demands to know where her toy is, she finds it and tells the guards, "I got all of you now." Eli is too stoned to understand the exchange.

Eli takes her back to the hotel room, where he takes more pills and passes out right after witnessing what appears to be the actress's rape and murder. In his opiate daze, he cannot be sure. By the next morning, the memory is buried. Eli needs to pull together a charity benefit. He is tempted to leave New York for good with Victoria (Kim Basinger), Eli's former sister-in-law and widow of his deceased brother. Victoria's feelings for Eli are mutual and she genuinely cares about and desires him. She offers him life away from his current lifestyle. However, Eli is hesitant, for she is his brother's widow.

But, his work is interrupted by the police who question him and by acquaintances trying to ascertain how much Eli has seen and recalls. Eli finally realizes he is involved in something politically dangerous, and powerful forces are at play to keep his mouth shut. As he strives to bring together the people he knows – members of the Black and Jewish communities, film stars, and media – for the grand fundraiser, Eli's life is in grave danger. Eli struggles with remembering exactly what happened that night. Through a series of flashbacks combined with visits from the people he knows, the viewer learns that Eli's life is in danger when Eli fails to realize the danger. However, it is revealed that the people Eli trusts are the people who are threatened by the photos. Eli pulls off a successful event surrounded by these individuals. Unfortunately, his success is comprehended after he is killed by the people who made it a success.

Cast
 Al Pacino as Eli Wurman
 Kim Basinger as Victoria Gray
 Ryan O'Neal as Cary Launer
 Téa Leoni as Jilli Hopper
 Richard Schiff as Elliot Sharansky
 Bill Nunn as The Reverend Lyle Brunt
 Robert Klein as Dr. Sandy Napier
 Mark Webber as Ross

Filming
The filming took place in New York City in February 2001.

Release
The film was originally scheduled to be released in late 2001. Following the terrorist attacks on September 11, 2001, however, the film was postponed to an October 2002 release, due to the film containing shots of the World Trade Center. However, the shots of the World Trade Center were removed from the film before its release. They can be found on the DVD release.

Reception
The film received mixed reviews. On Rotten Tomatoes it was given a rating of 43%, making it "rotten." The consensus was that the plot is derivative and incoherent, and that it does not engage the viewer.

Empire gave a largely positive review, awarding four stars out of five, noting: "May be a slow-burn, but despite its lack of success elsewhere, it’s still more than worthy of its long-delayed cinema release. Discerning audiences willing to invest in the characters will soon warm to the downbeat story and Al Pacino’s subdued performance – especially the scenes he shares with Basinger." BBC called it an "intriguing but deeply flawed thriller." Time Out's review observed: "With its uncertainties of tone, this is a mess, full of misplaced performances (not least Basinger as Eli's supportive sister-in-law), misfires and moral inconsistencies. But its rebellious spirit is commendable."

References

External links
 
 
 
 

2002 films
2002 crime drama films
American crime drama films
English-language German films
German crime drama films
Films about actors
Miramax films
Impact of the September 11 attacks on cinema
Films set in New York City
Films shot in New York City
Films directed by Daniel Algrant
Films produced by Michael Nozik
Films scored by Terence Blanchard
2000s English-language films
2000s American films
2000s German films